Ras-related protein Rab-5B is a protein that in humans is encoded by the RAB5B gene.

References

Further reading